The Zamindars of Kanihati, also known as the Chaudhury family of Kanihati, are a notable zamindar family of the Sylhet region. The family was started with the marriage of a Tripuri princess with Abd al-Malik, the son of Shah Halim ad-Din Narnauli - an Arab Sufi saint and companion of Shah Jalal. The title of Chowdhury was used by the family after it was granted to Nasir ad-Din by the Mughal Empire.

Origins
Following the Conquest of Sylhet in 1303, Shah Halim ad-Din, a Sufi saint who previously lived in Narnaul, and his son, Dawlat Shah Abd al-Malik, migrated to Kanihati which was ruled by Aslam Roy of Kailashahar. Roy insisted on rewarding Halim some of his land, after receiving assistance in capturing a tiger. Roy and his courtiers made a decision that they would fire an arrow (teer) and wherever it lands, that land would be given to Halim. This place was named Teerpasha and later became known as Tarapasha (now located in Rajnagar). After becoming a Muslim, Roy felt that Halim was more deserving of his kingdom and so he migrated elsewhere to seek further knowledge, leaving behind his wife, Kani, also known as the Kanak Rani. Helimuddin built her a house and pond, and this remains in existence, known as Kanir Bari and Kanir Pukur to the locals. This area came to be known as Kanakhati or Kanihati (the haat of Kani). Kani's daughter, Rajrani, grew a love for the religion of Islam as well, eventually becoming a Muslima and changing her name to Bibi Hasiba. She married Abd al-Malik, thus starting the Tripuri-Arab bloodline. Kani also became a Muslim shortly after this.

History
After Helim Uddin  died, he was buried in a mazar in Kanihati. This mazar is no longer existence due to the Manu River erosion. He was succeeded by his son Abd al-Malik and the kingdom became known as Abdul Malik Taluq. Abd al-Malik and Hasiba had a daughter, Bibi Hamira, who married Shah Mustafa, of Chandrapur, and they had a son called Shah Hasan. Abd al-Malik and Hasiba moved to the village of Kaula, and gave birth to another son by the name of Sultan Khan. In the western hilly area of the Taluq, Abd al-Malik was also said to have set up a dwelling place on top of a hill now known as the Puran Bari of Hajipur. Sultan established the village of Sultanpur when he grew older. Sultan's son, Dawud Khan, also founded a village which he named Dawudpur. His son, Bhuiyan Mian Khan founded the village of Bhuiga. Mian had two sons; Noor Khan and Qalb-e-Khan. The Kanihati Pargana was then divided into two for both sons to rule.

During the reign of Sultan Alauddin Husain Shah, the Zamindars of Kanihati were suppressed in supporting Bazid of Pratapgarh by the Sultan's minister Sarwar.

Noor Khan had four sons; Sanjab, Sharif, Madha and Kacha. Qalb-e-Khan lived in the village of Srisurya where he made a pond now known as Qalb-e-Khar Pukur (Pond of Qalb-e-Khan). Qalb and his wife remain buried in a grave next to the pond. They left behind a son by the name of Majlis Maramat Khan.

Maramat abandoned Srisurya, migrating to a new village which he named Rauzanpur after his wife, Rauzan Bibi. Maramat had 4 sons; Quli, Sharif, Bara and Ismail. His eldest son founded Sirajpur, which he also named after his wife, Siraj Bibi and his second son Ismail Khan settled in Ismailpur. The fourth son, Badr Bara Khan, had a son called Afzal.

Afzal was the father of Mian ad-Din who had two sons by the name of Nasir ad-Din and Eshab ad-Din Yusuf. Nasir ad-Din was loyal to the Mughal Empire and assisted Islam Khan I and Lodi Khan, the Qanungoh of Sylhet, in defeating the Afghan chieftain Khwaja Usman in 1612. As a reward, Nasir was granted the villages of Paboi and Mahtabpur and given the title of Chowdhury on the 21st Safar.

During the reign of Emperor Farrukhsiyar (r. 1713-1719), a member of this family wrote a Persian book called Rauzat-us-Saliheen (روضة الصالحين).

Eshab's son, Haji Muhammad Khan Chaudhury founded the village of Hajipur. Haji's son, Shaykh Bahadur Chaudhury, was famed for his wealth. He had a son called Shaykh Muzaffar Chaudhury, better known as Sonathakur, who built a home in Palpur. Muhammad Mansur Chaudhury and Muhammad Maniyar Chaudhury were Sonathakur's two sons. Maniyar returned to Hajipur where he made a pond and also built a bridge across the Palki river. Mansur's sons were Muhammad Mazhar, Muhammad Bakhsh and Abd al-Ghafur.

Mazhar's son was Jalal Bakht who had a son: Masud Bakht. He had two sons: Mahmud Bakht Choudhury and Taher Bakht Choudhury. Mahmud Bakht had two sons, Mahbub Bakht Choudhury and Mashud Bakht Choudhury.

M.N.A. Abdul Muntaquim Chaudhury is the son of Khan Bahadur Tajammul Ali Chaudhury, the deputy commissioner or hakim for colonial Sylhet. Tajammul was also the author of the Tawārīkh-i-Halīmī (তোওয়ারিখ-হেলিমী), a family history of Shah Halim al-Din, published in Dhaka in 1894. Tajammul's eldest son was Abdul Munim Chaudhury, who married Sufia Khatun Chaudhury (d. 19 July 2007) - the youngest daughter of Sara Khatun and Khan Bahadur Ghawthuddin Ahmad Chaudhury of Daudpur.  Abdul Muntaquim Chaudhury is an organiser of our Muktijuddho and one of the writer of Bangladesh Constitution and played an important role regarding Article 70 of the constitution.  He was the first person as an ambassador to Japan and South Korea in early 70's to initiate activities that led to Bangladesh's garment Industry.  He has also been an architect of close Bangladesh-Japan relationship through his close relationship in those days with Japanese Senator Hayakawa.  One product of those important interactions is the Hotel Sonargaon of Dhaka constructed with Japanese funds.

Abd al-Ghafur had a son called Diwan Ali Gawhar Chaudhury. Gawhar married Zahura Banu and had many children. Their sons were Akmal Ali, Maqbulur Rahman, Arzad Ali, Mahmud Ali Haydar  and Ajmal Ali, and their daughters were Qamar un-Nisa, Najm un-Nisa and Asmat un-Nisa. Ajmal Ali Chaudhury of Hajipur was an author who wrote Islami Shikkha, Islam Robi and Islamik Tahzeeb.

Akmal's son was called Abd al-Hannan Sulaiman Chaudhury who was born in 1898. He married Fatima Khatun and had 7 children. Sulaiman died in 1970 at the age of 71/72 years.

Abd al-Mumit Chaudhury, a son of Sulaiman, was born on 28 June 1928 in Moulvibazar. He was an accountant by profession. Abd al-Mumit had three children, two of whom were Noor and Manzoor. Abd al-Mumit died on 18 December 1999 in Dhaka at the age of 71. He was buried in Kanihati.

Abd al-Mannan Ibrahim Chaudhury, who was the cousin of Sulaiman, was a popular politician. In the 1930s, he became a chairman of the South Sylhet local board, and this led to him being given the popular nickname of "Chairman Saheb". He was later invited to the All India Agricultural Conference in Delhi. He joined the Assam Legislative Council, focusing on areas of education. In the 1940s, he was a general organiser for tea garden labourers, civil teachers and clerks and also helped in employment opportunities for young Muslims, who were hugely underrepresented. After the Partition of India in 1947, he became the vice president of the East Pakistan federation of labour. Travelling alongside the likes of Aftab Ali, Abdul Motaleb Malik and Faiz Ahmad Faiz, he took part in many conferences of the International Labour Organization, visiting Havana, Miami, Iraq, Geneva and Iceland. His work was instrumental for Sylheti seamen and lascars that settled in the United Kingdom, lobbying their problems to senior politicians, even back in Karachi and Dhaka. In Nice, he met up with Aga Khan III. He married Hafiza Khatun, and they had a son called Abed Chaudhury, born in February 1956. Later that year, Abd al-Mannan was diagnosed with cancer and went to London for operations. He died in 1956, in his early 60s, and was buried in Brookwood Cemetery in Brookwood, Surrey.

Manzoor had two sons. Noor married Shahida Akhtar and had two children. Abd al-Jalal Chaudhury was an Islamic scholar and advocate who lived in Hajipur, Kanihati. He was an alumnus of Murari Chand College in Sylhet.

Related families
From Shah Halim ad-Din's progeny that remained in Kaula, another Chaudhury family emerged. Four taluks (16-19) in the Longla Pargana were granted to Muhammad Ulkot Chaudhury, Muhammad Najat Chaudhury, Muhammad Arshad Chaudhury and Muhammad Asghar Chaudhury respectively.

Belonging to the Puran Bari of Hajipur, Mawlana Warith Muhammad was a locally renowned Islamic scholar who married the daughter of the sister of Bala Mian, the Zamindar of Kotarkona (near Manu railway station) during the Mughal period. Warith inherited the eastern part of Bala Miah's zamindari which included Manu and Kanihati. His son was Mawlana Rashid Muhammad. Two prominent local saints of the time were Jharu Shah and Kalbaka Shah. Rashid married the daughter of Jharu Shah and had four sons. His youngest son, Hafiz Ali Muhammad, who completed his education at the Darul Uloom Deoband and served as a muhaddith there for two decades. He went back to the Kanihati Puran Bari at an old age, returning due to an illness. He gained prominence here and one of his home students were Mawlana Abd al-Majid Bolorampuri. Hafiz used to be carried in a palanquin to events in Longla, Kanihati and Bhanugach because he was too weak to walk. When Hafiz became very feeble, he wrote a letter and gave it to Majid, commanding him to study in Deoband as he was no longer able to teach due to his disabilities. Abd al-Majid spent a number of years in Deoband and by the time he returned, Hafiz had passed away after three years of returning to his country. This was also the case with other students of Deoband such as Lutfur Rahman Bornobi and Bashir Uddin Shaykh-e-Bagha who visited the Puran Bari after completing their education.

Zamindar Bala Mian's daughter was married off to Alaa ad-Din, a British army captain who inherited all the western lands of Bala Mian. The zamindari then became known as Alauddin State and included Kotarkona, Kaukapon and Tarapasha. He had two sons; Haku Mian and Baghu Mian. They were famed zamindars so much so that poems and rhymes about them were made, some which can still be heard today.

Moulvi Nawaz Muhammad migrated from Kanihati to Bhanugach. He had two sons. Maulvi Muhammad Misir Ullah (Misir Ali) was young when his father died, and with the help of his elder brother he studied at an Alia Madrasa. After the death of his brother, he had no choice but to drop out of education as no one else could look after the family. However he continued to mingle with scholars such as Moulvi Bajid Ali Rupospuri and Mawlana Abd al-Majid Bolorampuri. Eventually, Misir became a teacher at the Rupospur Madrasa. Although he moved to Rampur where he built a new house, he was buried in Rupospur family graveyard. His family are spread across Rampur, Rupospur, Kanihati, Longla and Kulaura and were talukdars. Some also live in Srimangal, the United Kingdom and the United States.

One of the five sons of Qutb al-Awliya of Taraf & Narpati migrated to Kaula and Amanipur in the Longla Pargana. Some of the notable descendants of this family are Syed Basir al-Hasan, Shah Burhan ad-Din and Abd an-Nur. The latter was the father of Syed Mafiz Nur.

See also
 History of Sylhet

References

Mughal nobility
Asian noble families
Bangladeshi families
Bengali families
People from Kulaura Upazila
Zamindari estates
Bangladeshi people of Arab descent